Meekins Barn is a historic tobacco barn located near Floydale, Dillon County, South Carolina. It was built before 1935, and is an example of a log tobacco barn. It is a large, five -"room" log barn with a metal-covered gable roof. The building has an arched firebox on the left elevation, a brick foundation reinforced by concrete, and weatherboard has been added between the logs. The gable ends are also weatherboarded.

It was listed on the National Register of Historic Places in 1984.

References

Barns on the National Register of Historic Places in South Carolina
National Register of Historic Places in Dillon County, South Carolina
Buildings and structures completed in 1935
Buildings and structures in Dillon County, South Carolina
Tobacco buildings in the United States
Agriculture in South Carolina
Barns in South Carolina
Tobacco barns